In representation theory, the stable module category is a category in which projectives are "factored out."

Definition 
Let R be a ring. For two modules M and N over R, define  to be the set of R-linear maps from M to N modulo the relation that f ~ g if f − g factors through a projective module. The stable module category is defined by setting the objects to be the R-modules, and the morphisms are the equivalence classes .

Given a module M, let P be a projective module with a surjection . Then set  to be the kernel of p. Suppose we are given a morphism  and a surjection  where Q is projective. Then one can lift f to a map  which maps  into . This gives a well-defined functor  from the stable module category to itself.

For certain rings, such as Frobenius algebras,  is an equivalence of categories. In this case, the inverse  can be defined as follows. Given M, find an injective module I with an inclusion . Then  is defined to be the cokernel of i. A case of particular interest is when the ring R is a group algebra.

The functor Ω−1 can even be defined on the module category of a general ring (without factoring out projectives), as the cokernel of the injective envelope.  It need not be true in this case that the functor Ω−1 is actually an inverse to Ω.  One important property of the stable module category is it allows defining the Ω functor for general rings.  When R is perfect (or M is finitely generated and R is semiperfect), then Ω(M) can be defined as the kernel of the projective cover, giving a functor on the module category.  However, in general projective covers need not exist, and so passing to the stable module category is necessary.

Connections with cohomology 
Now we suppose that R = kG is a group algebra for some field k and some group G. One can show that there exist isomorphisms
 
for every positive integer n. The group cohomology of a representation M is given by  where k has a trivial G-action, so in this way the stable module category gives a natural setting in which group cohomology lives. 

Furthermore, the above isomorphism suggests defining cohomology groups for negative values of n, and in this way one recovers Tate cohomology.

Triangulated structure 

An exact sequence
 
 
Taking  to be the translation functor and such sequences as above to be exact triangles, the stable module category becomes a triangulated category.

See also 
 Stable homotopy theory

References 
  J. F. Carlson, Lisa Townsley, Luis Valero-Elizondo, Mucheng Zhang, Cohomology Rings of Finite Groups, Springer-Verlag, 2003.

Category theory
Representation theory
Homotopy theory